The Government of Mizoram (Mizo: Mizoram Sawrkâr) also known as the State Government of Mizoram, or locally as State Government, is the supreme governing authority of the Indian state of Mizoram and its 11 districts. It consists of an executive, led by the Governor of Mizoram, a judiciary and a legislative branch.

Like other states of India, the head of the state of Mizoram is the Governor, appointed by the President of India on the advice of the Central government. The Chief Minister is the head of the government. Aizawl is the capital of Mizoram, and houses the Mizoram Legislative Assembly and the secretariat. The Guwahati High Court, located in Guwahati, Assam has an Aizawl Bench that exercises the jurisdiction and powers  in respect of cases arising in the State of Mizoram.

The present Legislative Assembly of Mizoram is unicameral, consisting of 40 Member of the Legislative Assembly (M.L.A). Its term is 5 years, unless sooner dissolved.

Council of Ministers
The Chief Minister of Mizoram Zoramthanga took oath of office on December 15, 2018 with the following ministers.

Cabinet Minister

Minister of State

See also
Government of India

References